is a railway station on the Amagi Line located in Ogōri, Fukuoka Prefecture, Japan.  It is operated by the Amagi Railway, a third sector public-private partnership corporation.

Lines
All Amagi Line trains stop at the station.

Layout
The station consists of a side platform serving a single bi-directional track. There is no station building but an enclosed shelter is provided on the platform for waiting passengers. Access to the platform is by a flight of steps or a ramp. A bike shed is provided by the station entrance and parking for cars is available.

Platforms

Adjacent stations

History
Amagi Railway opened the station on 1 December 2002 as an added station on the existing Amagi Line track.

Surrounding area 
 Japan National Route 500
 Oita Expressway Chikugo Ogōri Interchange

References

Railway stations in Fukuoka Prefecture
Railway stations in Japan opened in 2002